Bayandelger (Rich wide) is a sum in the west of Mongolia's Töv Province. In 2005, it had 1226 inhabitants in 429 households.

History

The sum was founded in 1923, under the name Gün sum and as part of the khoshuu of Darkhan Khoshoi Chin Wang Puntsogtsereng in the Tüsheet Khan aimag. 1924 it was renamed to Batdelger uulyn sum, and in 1931 it was renamed again. In 1956 it was split between the Bayan and Erdene sums, with most of the territory going to the latter. In 1959, the Bayandelger sum was re-established.

Livestock

In 2004, there were 64,000 heads of livestock, including 19,000 goats, 35,000 sheep, 3,500 heads of cattle, 6900 horses and 71 camels.

Miscellaneous

D. Natsagdorj was born in what is now Bayandelger sum.

References

Districts of Töv Province